James Kenneth Peterson (born November 21, 1978) is a former American football defensive end. He was drafted by the Green Bay Packers in the third round of the 2003 NFL Draft. He played college football at Ohio State.

Early years
Peterson played high school football at McKinley High School in Canton, Ohio, where he was a teammate of former Broncos head coach Josh McDaniels' brother Ben McDaniels. While there he helped his team win the Ohio Division I title in 1997. During his senior year, he was honored as an All-American after posting 101 tackles and 15 sacks. Peterson was also a star basketball player achieving all-city selection as a senior.

College career
Peterson played college football at Ohio State. During his senior season, he was honored with second-team All-Big Ten Conference and helped his team win the BCS National Championship Game. He finished his college career with 84 tackles, 12 sacks, one interception, and three forced fumbles.

Professional career

Green Bay Packers
Peterson was drafted by the Green Bay Packers in the third round of the 2003 NFL Draft. He spent three seasons in Green Bay recording three sacks. He was released by the Packers on September 2, 2006.

Denver Broncos
On October 11, 2006, Peterson signed with the Denver Broncos. He was suspended for the first four games of the 2007 season for violating the NFL's steroid policy. During 2007 the Broncos released him twice but decided to re-sign him each time. On March 4, 2009, Peterson re-signed with the Broncos on a three-year contract. He was cut once again on March 10, 2010.

References

1978 births
Living people
American football defensive ends
Denver Broncos players
Green Bay Packers players
Ohio State Buckeyes football players
Players of American football from Canton, Ohio